Pamela Hollett is a South African former cricketer who played as an all-rounder. She appeared in four Test matches for South Africa between in 1960 and 1961, all against England, scoring 71 runs in her seven innings. She played domestic cricket for Southern Transvaal.

References

External links
 
 

Living people
Date of birth missing (living people)
Year of birth missing (living people)
Place of birth missing (living people)
South African women cricketers
South Africa women Test cricketers
Central Gauteng women cricketers